Ricardo Scheffler (born 29 June 1948) is a Mexican rower. He competed at the 1968 Summer Olympics and the 1972 Summer Olympics.

References

External links
 

1948 births
Living people
Mexican male rowers
Olympic rowers of Mexico
Rowers at the 1968 Summer Olympics
Rowers at the 1972 Summer Olympics
Rowers from Mexico City
Pan American Games medalists in rowing
Pan American Games bronze medalists for Mexico
Rowers at the 1975 Pan American Games
20th-century Mexican people
21st-century Mexican people